Darren Cahill and Mark Kratzmann were the defending champions but only Cahill competed that year with Wally Masur.

Cahill and Masur won in the final 6–4, 6–3 against Pieter Aldrich and Danie Visser.

Seeds

  Pieter Aldrich /  Danie Visser (final)
  Darren Cahill /  Wally Masur (champions)
  Martin Davis /  Brad Drewett (first round)
  Gary Muller /  Christo van Rensburg (semifinals)

Draw

References
 1989 New South Wales Open Men's Doubles Draw

Men's Doubles